Rakesh Gangwal (born 1952 or 1953) is an Indian-American billionaire businessman. He is the co-founder and 37% owner of IndiGo airline. He is the former chief executive officer (CEO) and chairman of US Airways Group. From June 2003 to August 2007, Gangwal was the chairman, president, and chief executive officer of Worldspan Technologies, a provider of travel technology and information services to the travel and transportation industry. From 2002 to 2003, Gangwal was involved in various personal business endeavors, including private equity projects and consulting projects. He was the president and CEO of US Airways Group from 1998 until his resignation in 2001.

Early life 
Gangwal was born in 1953. He attended Don Bosco (Park Circus) before earning a bachelor's degree in Mechanical Engineering from the Indian Institute of Technology Kanpur in 1975, and an MBA degree from the Wharton School of the University of Pennsylvania.

Career 
Prior to joining US Airways, he served as executive vice president for Air France, beginning in November 1994. His association with the airline industry began in September 1980, when as an associate of Booz Allen & Hamilton, Inc., he worked closely with United Airlines. In 1984, he joined United Airlines as manager, strategic planning. He held a series of positions at United Airlines. Previously, Gangwal had been a financial analyst in the product development group of Ford Motor Co and a production and planning engineer with Philips India Ltd.

Gangwal has served on the board of advisers of the University of Colorado (Denver), the board of trustees of Providence St. Mel School (Chicago), the Board of Directors of the Airline Tariff Publishing Co. and Board of Trustees of the Alexian Brothers Medical Center (Elk Grove, Illinois, USA). Gangwal was conferred with the Distinguished Alumnus Award of the Indian Institute of Technology Kanpur.

In April 2022 Gangwal donated a sum of ₹100 crore to set up a school of medical sciences and technology at IIT-Kanpur which also received another ₹200 crore in donations from other alumni for the medical institution, which will have a 450-bed super speciality hospital and several centres of excellence.

In 2020, he was ranked No. 359 in the Forbes 400 list of the richest people in America.

Personal life 
Gangwal is married, with one daughter, and lives in Miami, Florida. Their daughter Parul worked for the enterprise software company Salesforce in California. She launched her own start-up Wheelhouse Capital in June 2021.

References 

1953 births
American people of Indian descent
Rajasthani people
Living people
IIT Kanpur alumni
American Jains
Businesspeople from Kolkata
Wharton School of the University of Pennsylvania alumni
American company founders
American chief executives
American billionaires